Angkola (also known as Batak Angkola or Anakola) people are one of the sub-ethnic groups comprising the Batak people from North Sumatra who live in South Tapanuli regency. The Angkola language is similar to Mandailing language, but it is sociolinguistically distinct.

The name Angkola is believed to have originate from the Angkola river or Batang Angkola, which was named by an officer called Rajendra Kola (Angkola or city lord) who was passing through Padang Lawas and later came to power there. The southern (downstream) part of the Angkola river is called Angkola Jae, while the northern (upstream) part is called Angkola Julu.

The Angkola people practice patrilineal kinship, and the clans and surnames of Angkola people are based on the patrilineal system. There are only a few Angkola surnames - Siregar, Dalimunthe, Harahap, Hasibuan, Rambe, Nasution, Daulay, Tanjung, Ritonga, Batubara and Hutasuhut, amongst others. Angkola society strictly prohibits marriage between people with the same surname.

References 

Ethnic groups in Indonesia
Ethnic groups in Sumatra
History of Sumatra
Ethnography
Batak
Batak ethnic groups